The 2007 Angola Basketball Super Cup (14th edition) was contested by Petro Atlético, as the 2006 league champion and Primeiro de Agosto, the 2006 cup winner. Primeiro de Agosto was the winner, making it its 6th title.

The 2007 Women's Super Cup (12th edition) was contested by Primeiro de Agosto, as the 2006 women's league champion and Interclube, the 2006 cup runner-up. Interclube was the winner, making it its 1st title.

2007 Men's Super Cup

2007 Women's Super Cup

See also
 2007 Angola Basketball Cup
 2007 BAI Basket

References

Angola Basketball Super Cup seasons
Super Cup